Turbonilla pocahontasae is a species of sea snail, a marine gastropod mollusk in the family Pyramidellidae, the pyrams and their allies.

Distribution
This species occurs in the following locations:
 North West Atlantic

Notes
Additional information regarding this species:
 Distribution: Range: 37.9°N ; 75.5°W. Distribution: USA: Virginia

References

External links
 To Encyclopedia of Life
 To USNM Invertebrate Zoology Mollusca Collection
 To ITIS
 To World Register of Marine Species

pocahontasae
Gastropods described in 1914